The Fernström Prize is a series of annual awards for prominent Swedish and Nordic scientists in medicine. The prize money is donated by the Eric K. Fernström' Foundation. The prizes are managed by the medical faculty at Lund University.

Nordic Prize 
The Nordic Fernström Prize (Nordiska Fernströmpriset) is awarded annually to an outstanding Nordic scientist in medicine. The prize money is one million krona (approximately €100,000).

Recipients of the Nordic Fernström Prize

Swedish Prize 
The Swedish Fernström Prize (Svenska Fernströmpriset) is awarded annually to six promising Swedish scientists in medicine. The prizes are distributed so that each winner works in one of the six medical faculties in Sweden:

 Gothenburg (University of Gothenburg)
 Linköping (Linköping University)
 Lund (Lund University)
 Stockholm (Karolinska Institutet)
 Umeå (Umeå University)
 Uppsala (Uppsala University)

See also

 List of medicine awards
 List of prizes named after people

References 

Medicine awards
Lund University
Swedish awards